Whiteout is a snowmobile racing video game published by Konami for PlayStation 2, Microsoft Windows, and Xbox in 2002.

Reception

The PlayStation 2 and Xbox versions received "mixed" reviews according to the review aggregation website Metacritic.

References

External links
 

2002 video games
Konami games
Multiplayer and single-player video games
PlayStation 2 games
Racing video games
Vicarious Visions games
Video games developed in the United States
Windows games
Xbox games